Vital Nizigiyimana is a Tanzanian-American professional soccer player who plays as a midfielder for USL League One club Forward Madison FC.

Career

Youth and college
Nizigiyimana played soccer in high school for Tucker High School in Tucker, Georgia. He also played for Georgia United Academy.

In 2017, Nizigiyimana moved to Madison, Wisconsin and played for the Madison College Wolfpack and Madison 56ers.

Professional
In 2019, Nizigiyimana was signed to a contract with Forward Madison FC after a successful tryout. He re-signed with the team before the 2020 season.

References

External links
 
 Vital Nizigiyimana at Madison College Athletics
 

1997 births
Living people
American soccer players
Tanzanian footballers
Tanzanian expatriate footballers
Association football defenders
Forward Madison FC players
Soccer players from Georgia (U.S. state)
Sportspeople from DeKalb County, Georgia
USL League One players
United Premier Soccer League players